Ay Darvish (also Romanized as Āy Darvīsh) is a village in Aq Su Rural District, in the Central District of Kalaleh County, Golestan Province, Iran. At the 2006 census, its population was 2,254, in 457 families.

References 

Populated places in Kalaleh County